1995 Kashima Antlers season

Review and events

League results summary

League results by round

Competitions

Domestic results

J.League

Emperor's Cup

Player statistics

 † player(s) joined the team after the opening of this season.

Transfers

In:

Out:

Transfers during the season

In
 Carlos Mozer (from Benfica on July)
 Mazinho (from Flamengo on September)

Out
 Santos (to Shimizu S-Pulse on August)
 Ryūzō Morioka (to Shimizu S-Pulse)

Awards
J.League Best XI:  Naoki Soma

Notes

References

Other pages
 J. League official site
 Kashima Antlers official site

Kashima Antlers
Kashima Antlers seasons